Tomislav Bašić (born 9 January 1975) is a Croatian Olympic sailor that finished 19th in the Men's 470 class at the 2004 Summer Olympics together with Petar Cupać. Bašić won the 2015 Match Race Germany and finished second in the 2013 TP 52 World Championship.

References

Croatian male sailors (sport)
Olympic sailors of Croatia
470 class sailors
TP 52 class sailors
RC44 class sailors
Sailors at the 2004 Summer Olympics – 470
1975 births
Living people